The 5th constituency of the Côtes-d'Armor is a French legislative constituency in the Côtes-d'Armor département. Like the other 576 French constituencies, it elects one MP using the two-round system, with a run-off if no candidate receives over 50% of the vote in the first round.

Historic representation

Election results

2022

 
 
 
 
 
 
 
 
|-
| colspan="8" bgcolor="#E9E9E9"|
|-
 
 

 
 
 
 
 

* PS dissident

2017

2012

2007

Sources
 Official results of French elections from 1998: 

5